Hawkins may refer to:

Places

United States
Hawkins, Idaho, an unincorporated community
Hawkins Ranch, a historic ranch in Matagorda County, Texas
Hawkins, Texas
Hawkins, Wisconsin, a village
Hawkins (town), Wisconsin, a town
Hawkins Corner, Wisconsin, an unincorporated community
Hawkins County, Tennessee

Fiction
Hawkins, Indiana, setting of American science fiction horror drama television series Stranger Things

Elsewhere
Hawkins, Alberta, a locality in Canada

People
 Hawkins (name)

Fictional characters
 Hawkins (TV series), American television series starring James Stewart
 D.L. Hawkins, a character on the 2006 American NBC TV Series Heroes
 Jim Hawkins (character), a fictional character in Robert Louis Stevenson's novel Treasure Island
 Robert Hawkins, a character on the 2006 American CBS TV Series Jericho
 Sadie Hawkins, an Al Capp character responsible for Sadie Hawkins Day
Helen Hawkins, main character of the TV series Siren

Ships
 Hawkins-class cruiser, Royal Navy
 HMS Hawkins (D86), Royal navy cruiser 1919-1947

Other uses
 Hawkins Electrical Guide
 Hawkins grenade
 Hawkins Cookers

See also
 Hawking (disambiguation)
 Hawkins House (disambiguation)
 Justice Hawkins (disambiguation)